Hoedspruit (Afrikaans for Hat Creek) is a town situated at the foot of the Klein Drakensberg (Afrikaans for "Small Dragon Mountains" range), in the Limpopo province of South Africa, on the railway line from Tzaneen to Kaapmuiden.

Economy
The town, while still small, has grown in recent years. Due to its proximity to private game reserves and the Kruger National Park, ecotourism is a major contributor to the local economy.

Air Force Base Hoedspruit and Eastgate Airport
Air Force Base Hoedspruit is home to 19 Squadron, a helicopter unit of the South African Air Force. The civil Eastgate Airport, which shares the Air Force base's airfield, is served by  several charter operators.

A feasibility study was conducted on whether the airport could be upgraded to international status. The airport accommodated 57 000 passengers between 2008 and 2009 and has the capacity to handle between 10 000 and 11 000 additional passengers.

Education

Hoedspruit has various primary and secondary schools:
 Laerskool Drakensig
 Hoedspruit Christian School
 Southern Cross Schools
 Laerskool Mariepskop
 Hoedspruit Independent College
 Lowveld Academy
 Hoedspruit Secondary School

References

Populated places in the Maruleng Local Municipality